The Warlocks are an American rock band formed in Los Angeles, California, in 1998 by the guitarist/singer Bobby Hecksher. The band's music has ranged from psychedelic rock to drone music. There have been many changes in personnel since its formation, with Hecksher the only constant member.

History

Formation and signing to Bomp! 
The band was founded in 1998 in Los Angeles by Bobby Hecksher, adopting a name used by both the Velvet Underground and the Grateful Dead in their early days. At the age of fifteen, Hecksher moved to Los Angeles from Florida with his family. Hecksher's first instrument was cello, eventually moving on to bass guitar. Hecksher's grandfather owned a radio station.

In the years before the formation of the band, Hecksher was busy with a number of other projects in Los Angeles, including Charles Brown Superstar, Don Knotts Overdrive (Hecksher left DKO in 1995 and the band eventually changed its name to Head Set due to legal threats from the actual Don Knotts), and Magic Pacer, played bass guitar with Beck on the Stereopathic Soulmanure album and also with The Brian Jonestown Massacre for a brief period.

The Warlocks played their first gig on July 4, 1998. Receiving comparisons with White Light/White Heat-era Velvet Underground and Spacemen 3, the band signed a two-album deal with the renowned indie label Bomp! in October 2000. Supposedly signed in Hecksher's blood, the contract with Bomp! yielded the band's first release in 2000, the mini-album The Warlocks. This was followed by the release of its first full-length record, Rise and Fall, in 2001. Rise and Fall received a four-and-a-half-star review from AllMusic, with Bryan Thomas describing it as a "solid effort". Hecksher worked as a games tester for DreamWorks until at least 2001.

Birdman and Mute contracts 
After the release of Rise and Fall the band left Bomp! and signed with Birdman Records. The EP Phoenix was released by Birdman in 2002 and was followed by a full-length album  also called Phoenix, which was also released in 2002, to positive acclaim. Phoenix included a collaboration with Peter Kember (Sonic Boom), of Spacemen 3 and Spectrum, on the song "Hurricane Heart Attack". "Shake the Dope Out" and "Baby Blue" were also released as singles. The group toured the US and overseas with Black Rebel Motorcycle Club, the Raveonettes and Interpol.

Following Phoenix, the Warlocks signed to Mute and released Surgery in 2005, produced by Tom Rothrock. The record represents a departure from their earlier psychedelic sound into dreamier pop territory, while retaining the band's hard-edged brand of rock. The songs on this record are shorter and more structured than some of their previous work. "Come Save Us" was released as a single. Surgery received a mixed reception from critics; A PopMatters review by Stephen Haag rated it at 6 out of 10, while a Pitchfork review gave the album only a 1.7 out of 10 rating, with Nick Sylvester describing the album as "A mopey bunch of trite sap O.D.-type tales almost as unstomachable as the band's former crapothecary hymns." Prefix gave the album 8.0 out of 10, describing it as "far more approachable" than their earlier releases. The album's lack of commercial success led to the end of their deal with Mute.

Later releases 
In the years after Surgery, the band toured internationally and sustained changes to the lineup, leading up to the 2007 release of Heavy Deavy Skull Lover on Tee Pee. The album was, according to Hecksher, recorded over a single weekend, with the band members quitting afterwards. The album is considered darker than their previous work, with the band exploring a more experimental direction. A review in Spin described the album as "funereal" and "sluggishly unrealised", while AllMusic called it "uneven". Heavy Deavy Skull Lover was recorded as a four-piece and marks a brief hiatus from the band for founding member John Christian Rees, who later returned before work began on their 2009 album, The Mirror Explodes. The Mirror Explodes was released in 2009 by Tee Pee. Production of the record was assisted by Joey Santiago of the Pixies.

The years following The Mirror Explodes saw two online releases by the band, available through Bandcamp, as well as a reissue of Rise and Fall via Zap Banana/Cargo in October 2010 which included previously unreleased rarities and artwork by Darren Grealish. The first of the online releases, the highly experimental EXP, was released on January 1, 2010. The second, Enter At Your Own Skull: Unreleased Volume One, a compilation of B-sides, demos and outtakes, was released on June 9, 2011. Besides the online releases and Rise and Fall reissue, the years after The Mirror Explodes were filled with intermittent touring and more line-up changes, resulting in the band solidifying as a five-piece.

The band provided another commercial release in 2013 with Skull Worship, also via Zap Banana/Cargo (distribution). Skull Worship was released on November 26, 2013.

The Warlocks' seventh studio album, Songs from the Pale Eclipse, was released on September 2. A single, "Lonesome Bulldog", was released in promotion for the album in June 2016.

The Warlocks' eighth studio album, Mean Machine Music, was released onMay 31, 2019.

The Warlocks' ninth studio album, The Chain, was released on April 3, 2020.

Musical style
The band's music has been described as psychedelic rock. In 2008, Hecksher said of the band's sound "...even though it's seemingly chaotic, achieving our sound is a really specific process. We need all these big, hollow-bodied guitars going through old Fender amps with reverb, or it won’t work."

In 2007, the bass guitarist Jenny Fraser described the songwriting process: "Hecksher writes the skeleton of the songs and everyone writes their own parts. He always draws the picture and we paint it in."

Hecksher acknowledges influences including The Velvet Underground, Spacemen 3, Spiritualized and The Jesus and Mary Chain.

Personnel

 Current members

 Bobby Hecksher – vocals, guitar, keyboards, bass guitar
 John Christian Rees – guitar, feedback
 Earl V. Miller – guitar, drone machine
 Christopher DiPino – bass guitar
 Jason Anchondo – drums

 Former members

 Ryan McBride – guitar
 Bob Mustachio – drums
 Suzanne Jana Risher – bass guitar
 Mimi Star – bass guitar
 Bobby Martine – bass guitar
 Jenny Fraser – bass guitar
 Corey Lee Granet – guitar, piano
 Jeff Levitz – guitar, lap steel, sitar
 Jen Chiba – bass guitar
 Caleb Sweazy – bass guitar, acoustic guitar
 Laura Grigsby – organ, tambourine
 George Serrano – drums
 Hunter Crowley – drums
 Bobby Tamkin – drums
 Anton Newcombe – drums
 Theresa Saso – drums
 Danny Hole – drums

Discography
Studio albums

Live albums 

Online albums and compilations

Mini-albums/EPs

Singles
"Baby Blue" (2003), Mute
"Shake the Dope Out" (2003), Mute
"Hurricane Heart Attack" (2003), City Rockers
"It's Just Like Surgery" (2005), Mute
"Come Save Us" (2005), Mute
"Isolation"/"Red Camera" (2006), Bomp!

References

External links

Psychedelic rock music groups from California
Musical groups from Los Angeles
Mute Records artists
Neo-psychedelia groups
American shoegaze musical groups